Bray is a surname. Notable people with the surname include:

Alan Bray (1948–2001), British historian
Alastair Bray (born 1993), Australian footballer
Anna Eliza Bray (1790–1883), British novelist
Angie Bray (born 1953), British politician
Billy Bray (1794–1868), British preacher
Charles Bray (1811–1884), British philosopher
Charles Bray (glass artist) (1922–2012), British painter and glass sculptor
Curtis Bray (1970–2014), American football player and coach
David A. Bray, Executive-level technologist
Deanne Bray (born 1971), American actress
Dennis Bray, British scientist
Hiawatha Bray, American columnist
George Bray (1918–2002), English footballer
Graham Bray, rugby league footballer of the 1970s and 1980s
Jan de Bray (c. 1627–c. 1697), Dutch painter
Jeremy Bray (1930–2002), British politician
Jeremy Bray (born 1973), Irish cricketer
John Bray (athlete) (1875–1945), American athlete
John Bray (physician), botanist and physician
John Bray, British communications engineer
John Cox Bray (1842–1894), Australian politician
John Francis Bray (1809-1897) Economist and radical activist
John Jefferson Bray (1912–1995), Australian poet
John Randolph Bray (1879–1978), American animator
Leslie Bray (1895–1957), English first-class cricketer and an officer in both the British Army and Royal Air Force
Libba Bray (born 1964), American novelist
Lourinda Bray, American artist
Maury Bray (1909–1966), American football player
Massimo Bray (born 1959), Italian intellectual and politician
Michael Bray, American activist
Phyllis Bray (1911-1991), English artist
Quan Bray (born 1993), American football player
Ray Bray (1917-1996), American football player
Reginald Bray (c. 1440-1503), English courtier
Robert Bray (1917–1983), American actor
Roger Ernest Bray (1875–1952), Canadian activist
Russ Bray (born 1957), English darts announcer
Salomon de Bray (1597–1664), Dutch painter
Stephen Bray (born 1956), American musician
Steve Bray (activist) (born 1969), Welsh anti-Brexit activist
Thom Bray (born 1954), American actor
Thomas Bray (1658–1730), English clergyman
Tim Bray (born 1955), Canadian software developer
Trent Bray (born 1973), Former freestyle swimmer and surf lifesaver
Tyler Bray (born 1991), American football player

William C. Bray (1879-1946) American Chemist

English-language surnames